Thomas Jones Roberts (1924 – 2013) was a British ornithologist who was known for his work on the wildlife of Pakistan. Amongst his works are Mammals of Pakistan and Birds of Pakistan.

Early life
Roberts was born to Sir William Roberts, a civil servant who worked in the Indian Agriculture Service. He first came to the region in 1946.

Career
Roberts has been the managing director of Roberts Cotton Associates Ltd, a company founded by his father, since 1966.

Awards
 Sitara-e-Imtiaz (1994)
 Stamford Raffles Award (2002)
 World Wildlife Fund Award for Conservation Merit (thrice)

Bibliography
 Birds of Pakistan. 2 volumes. First edition: 1991
 The Mammals of Pakistan (1977)
 Butterflies of Pakistan (2001)
 Field Guide to the Small Mammals of Pakistan (2005)
 Field Guide to the Large and Medium-sized Mammals of Pakistan (2005)

References

External links 
 Obituary Note

British ornithologists
1924 births
2013 deaths
British expatriates in Pakistan